The 1982 King's Cup was held from 1 to 17 May 1982 in Bangkok.  Nine teams from eight nations participated.

Round 1

Group A

Group B 

Note: Malaysia's team was also reported as Kelantan by a Thai source.

Round 2

Group A

Group B

Knockout stage

Semi-finals

First legs

Second legs

Third place play-off 

Note: No extra time was played.  The score is also reported as 0–0, 5–4 on penalty shoot-out.

Final

References 
Abbink, Dinant; Morrison, Neil. "King's Cup 1982 (Bangkok, Thailand)". RSSSF.com
 "National Library Singapore". 

Kings Cup, 1982
King's Cup
Kings Cup, 1982
May 1982 sports events in Thailand